Osborne Association is a non-governmental, multi-service, criminal justice reform, and direct service organization. Osborne runs programs for people who have been in conflict with the law and their families. It operates from community offices in Brooklyn, The Bronx, Buffalo, Manhattan, and Newburgh, New York and inside more than two dozen New York State prisons and jails. They work with the families and communities of incarcerated individuals to try and redress harm done by the criminal justice system, whilst also working to reform the system by challenging racist policies and retributive justice.

Osborne was created by merging organizations that had been founded by Thomas Mott Osborne, former mayor of Auburn, New York and warden of Sing Sing Correctional Facility. The charity has a particular focus on the families of the incarcerated and advocates nationally for the needs of children with incarcerated parents, the rights of older adults in prison and reentry, and of the importance of prison educational programs.

History 

In 1913, Thomas Mott Osborne, an industrialist and former mayor of Auburn, New York, voluntarily spent a week in prison.  After his experience, Osborne committed himself to reforming the American prison system from society's "scrap heap into a human repair shop," to emphasize rehabilitation rather than punishment.

Dedicated to the idea of a criminal justice system that "restores to society the largest number of intelligent, forceful, honest citizens," Osborne went on to become a progressive warden at Sing Sing Correctional Facility, where the majority of the individuals released did not return to prison after finishing their sentences.  Osborne also established the Mutual Welfare League and the National Society of Penal Information.  The two organizations merged to form Osborne Association in 1933 to continue Osborne's work.

Leadership 
Archana Jayaram is the president and CEO of Osborne Association. Prior to joining Osborne in April 2022, she served in leadership positions at The Legal Aid Society, the New York City Department of Correction, the Department of Buildings, and SCO Family of Services. In February 2022, Osborne's Board of Directors announced that they had hired Archana Jayaram.

Jayaram succeeded Elizabeth Gaynes, who led the organization from 1984 to April 2022. Gaynes trained as a lawyer and began her legal career as a criminal defense attorney, working at a Buffalo, New York law firm involved in representing people incarcerated at Attica Correctional Facility during the 1971 prison uprising. Prior to coming to Osborne in 1985, she was an associate at the Pretrial Services Resource Center (now the Pretrial Justice Institute) in Washington D.C.

Programs 

Osborne Association has grown into a multi-service organization that addresses the needs of individuals involved in the criminal justice system from arrest through reentry. Osborne now operates more than 25 programs, including employment, substance abuse treatment, healthy parenting and relationships, and release planning. In accordance with existing research demonstrating that strong family relationships promote better reentry outcomes and reduce the likelihood of recidivism.

Family-focused programs
Osborne's programming is family-focused and provides opportunities for individuals to mend, maintain and strengthen their relationships with their families. The Pew Charitable Trusts found through their research that children of parents in prison are five times more likely to be expelled or suspended from school. Osborne Association found through their research that children are two times more likely to show signs of a mental health disorder, are more likely to live in poverty, and are more likely to experience attention disorders or major depression than the general population. Since 2006, Osborne has led the New York Initiative for Children of Incarcerated Parents, a 67-member coalition of government agencies and community- and faith-based organizations to "advocate for and support policies and practices that meet the needs and respect the rights of children and youth whose parents are involved in the criminal justice system." In 2016, Osborne Association received $1.3 million by the U.S. Department of Health and Human Services for their Working Parents activities, particularly the Responsible Fatherhood program which helps men who were incarcerated create deeper relationships after their release with their children. Osborne has long advocated for building and maintaining strong family relationships during incarceration. They offer free, clinically-supported video visiting for children with a parent in prison. Through that program, children are able to visit via a secure video connection to their incarcerated mom or dad from a comfortable, living-room-like space in one of Osborne's community-based offices.

Training and employment 
A catering business, Fresh Start Catering, provides training and employment opportunities to individuals who graduated from Osborne Associations' catering training programs on Rikers Island. This became part of Osborne's programs in 2008, and was started in 1989 by Barbara Margolis. The Career Center was started in 2009. It offers training, career development, coaching, and assistance in getting and keeping employment.

Publications 
 
 
 
Osborne Association (2011). A Call to Action: Safeguarding New York's Children of Incarcerated Parents
Osborne Association (2017). The High Cost of Low Risk: The Crisis of America's Aging Prison Population

References 

Social justice
Prisoner support
Non-profit organizations based in the Bronx
Organizations based in Brooklyn